Dalerpeel is a village in the Netherlands and it is part of the Coevorden municipality in Drenthe.

Dalerpeel was first mentioned in 1936, and means "the swamp of Dalen". It was originally a peat colony and the workers came from North Brabant. The village shares resources with neighbouring Nieuwe Krim.

References 

Coevorden
Populated places in Drenthe